Rosa Luxemburg (or ; 5 March 1871 – 15 January 1919) was a Polish and naturalised-German revolutionary socialist, Marxist philosopher and anti-war activist.

Born and raised in a secular Jewish family in Congress Poland, she became a German citizen in 1897. Successively, she was a member of the Proletariat party, the Social Democracy of the Kingdom of Poland and Lithuania (SDKPiL), the Social Democratic Party of Germany (SPD), the Independent Social Democratic Party (USPD), the Spartacus League, and the Communist Party of Germany (KPD).

After the SPD supported German involvement in World War I in 1915, Luxemburg and Karl Liebknecht co-founded the anti-war Spartacus League which eventually became the KPD. During the November Revolution, she co-founded the newspaper  (The Red Flag), the central organ of the Spartacist movement. Luxemburg considered the Spartacist uprising of January 1919 a blunder, but supported the attempted overthrow of the SPD-ruled Weimar Republic and rejected any attempt at a negotiated solution.

Due to her pointed criticism of both the Leninist and the more moderate social democratic schools of Marxism, Luxemburg has always had a somewhat ambivalent reception among scholars and theorists of the political left. Nonetheless, Luxemburg and Liebknecht were extensively idolised as communist martyrs by the East German communist government. The German Federal Office for the Protection of the Constitution (BVS) asserts that idolization of Luxemburg and Liebknecht is an important tradition of the 21st-century German far-left. Despite her own Polish nationality and strong ties to Polish culture, opposition from the PPS due to her stance against the 1918 independence of the Second Polish Republic and later criticism from Stalinists have made her a controversial historical figure in the present-day political discourse of the Third Polish Republic.

Life

Poland

Ancestry 

Little is known about Rozalia's great-grandparents, Elisza and Szayndla, but according to historical evidence it is likely they lived in Warsaw. Their son, Rosa's grandfather, Abraham Luxemburg probably lived in Warsaw before marrying Chana Szlam (Rosa's grandmother) and moving to Zamość. Abraham built a successful timber business there, based in Zamość and Warsaw but with links as far away as Danzig, Leipzig, Berlin, and Hamburg; although coming from humble origins, he became a wealthy businessman with transnational connections who could afford to provide for his children an education abroad in the German Empire. He supported the Jewish Reform movement, becoming a prominent member of the Zamość Maskilim. He was committed to Jewish emancipation, spoke Polish and Yiddish, and ensured that his children spoke these tongues too; it is unclear whether he took part in the November Uprising (1830–31) or not.

Abraham's son Edward was Róża's father. He was born in Zamość on 17 December 1830, the eldest of ten siblings and heir to his father's timber business. Edward Eliasz Luxenburg lost his mother at the age of 18. He met his wife Lina Löwenstein through his stepmother Amalia, who was Lina's older sister. Lina and Amalia were daughters of the Rabbi of Meseritz, Isaak Ozer Löwenstein, and their brother was the reform Rabbi Isachar Dov Berish (Bernhard) Löwenstein of Lemberg. Lina and Edward married around 1853 and lived together in Zamość, where Edward worked with his father. Like his father, Edward was a leading member of the Reform Jewish community in the city. When the January Uprising broke out, Edward delivered weapons to Polish partisans and organised fundraisers for the insurrection. After the fall of the uprising he became a target of the tsarist police and was forced into hiding in Warsaw, leaving his family behind in Zamość. During the 1860s and 1870s, Edward moved frequently and experienced financial difficulties; eventually the rest of the family, including two-year-old Rosa, joined him in Warsaw in 1873.

Origins 
Róża Luksemburg, actual birth name Rozalia Luksenburg, was born on 5 March 1871 at 45 Ogrodowa Street (now 7a Kościuszko Street) in Zamość. The Luxemburg family were Polish Jews living in the Russian sector of Poland, after the country was partitioned by Prussia, Russia and Austria almost a century earlier. She was the fifth and youngest child of Edward Eliasz Luxemburg and Lina Löwenstein. Her father Edward, like his father Abraham, supported the Jewish Reform movement. Luxemburg later stated that her father imparted an interest in liberal ideas to her while her mother was religious and well-read with books kept at home. The family moved to Warsaw in 1873. Polish and German were spoken at home; Luxemburg also learned Russian. After being bed-bound with a hip problem at the age of five, she was left with a permanent limp. Although over time she became fluent in Russian and French, Polish remained Róża's first language with German also spoken at a native level. Rosa was considered intelligent early on, writing letters to her family and impressing her relatives with recitals of poetry, including the Polish classic Pan Tadeusz.

Rory Castle writes: "From her grandfather and father [Rosa] inherited the belief that she was a Pole first and a Jew second, her passionate opposition to Tsarism and her emotional connection to Polish language and culture. Although her parents were religious, they did not consider themselves to be Jewish by nationality, rather 'Poles of the Mosaic persuasion. He also points out that more recent research into the Luxemburg family and her early years show that "Rosa Luxemburg gained a lot more from her family than has previously been understood by her biographers. Not only in terms of her education, financial support and assistance during her frequent incarcerations, but also in terms of her identity and politics. Her family was a closely knitted support network, even when its members were spread out across Europe. This solid foundation, which supported and encouraged her at every step, gave Luxemburg the intellectual and personal confidence to go out and attempt to change the world". It is especially from Luxemburg's private correspondence that it can be seen she in fact remained very close with her family throughout the years, despite being separated by borders and spread out across countries.

Education and activism 

In 1884, she enrolled at an all-girls' gymnasium (secondary school) in Warsaw, which she attended until 1887. The Second Women's Gymnasium was a school that only rarely accepted Polish applicants and acceptance of Jewish children was even more exceptional. The children were only permitted to speak Russian. At this school, Róża attended in secret circles studying the works of Polish poets and writers; officially this was forbidden due to the policy of Russification against Poles that was pursued in the Russian Empire at the time. From 1886, Luxemburg belonged to the illegal Polish left-wing Proletariat Party (founded in 1882, anticipating the Russian parties by twenty years). She began political activities by organising a general strike; as a result, four of the Proletariat Party leaders were put to death and the party was disbanded, though the remaining members, including Luxemburg, kept meeting in secret. In 1887, she passed her matura (secondary school graduation) examinations.

In order to escape detention, she fled to Switzerland through the "green border" in 1889. There she attended the University of Zurich (as did the socialists Anatoly Lunacharsky and Leo Jogiches), where she studied philosophy, history, politics, economics, and mathematics. Her doctoral dissertation "The Industrial Development of Poland" was officially presented in the spring of 1897 at the University of Zurich which awarded her a Doctor of Law degree. Her dissertation was published by Duncker and Humblot in Leipzig in 1898. An oddity in Zurich, she was one of the first women in the world with a doctorate in economy and the first Polish woman to achieve this.

In 1893, with Leo Jogiches and Julian Marchlewski (alias Julius Karski), Luxemburg founded the newspaper  (The Workers' Cause) which opposed the nationalist policies of the Polish Socialist Party. Luxemburg believed that an independent Poland could arise and exist only through socialist revolutions in Germany, Austria-Hungary and Russia. She maintained that the struggle should be against capitalism, not just for Polish independence. Her position of denying a national right of self-determination provoked a philosophic disagreement with Vladimir Lenin. She and Leo Jogiches co-founded the Social Democracy of the Kingdom of Poland and Lithuania (SDKPiL) party, after merging Congress Poland's and Lithuania's social democratic organisations. Despite living in Germany for most of her adult life, Luxemburg was the principal theoretician of the Social Democracy of the Kingdom of Poland (SDKP, later the SDKPiL) and led the party in a partnership with Jogiches, its principal organiser. She remained sentimental towards Polish culture, her favourite poet was Adam Mickiewicz, and she vehemently opposed the Germanisation of Poles in the Prussian Partition; in 1900 she published a brochure against this in Poznań. Earlier, in 1893, she also wrote against the Russification of Poles by the Russian Empire's absolutist government.

The 1905 revolution 

After the 1905 revolution broke out, against the advice of her Polish and German comrades, Luxemburg left for Warsaw. If she were to be recognised then the tsarist authorities would imprison her, but the October/November political strike, part of the upheaval in Russia with particularly active elements in Congress Poland, convinced Róża that at this time her place was in Warsaw instead of Berlin. She arrived there on 30 December thanks to her German friend Anna Matschke's passport and met up with Jogiches, who had returned to Warsaw a month earlier also on a false passport; they lived together in a pension at the corner of Jasna and Świętokrzyska streets, from where they wrote for the SDKPiL's illegally published paper  (The Red Banner). Luxemburg was one of the first writers to notice the 1905 revolution's potential for democratisation within the Russian Empire. In the years 1905-1906 alone, she made in Polish and German over 100 articles, brochures, appeals, texts, and speeches about the revolution. Although only the closest friends and comrades of Jogiches and Luxemburg knew of their return to the country, thanks to an agent placed by the tsarist authorities within the SDKPiL leadership the Okhrana came to arrest them on 4 March 1906.

They held her prisoner first at the ratusz jail, then at Pawiak prison and later at the Tenth Pavilion of the Warsaw Citadel. Luxemburg continued to write for the SDKPiL in secret behind prison walls; her works were smuggled out of the facility. After two officers of the Okhrana were bribed by her relatives, a temporary release on bail was secured for her on 28 June 1906 for health reasons until the court trial; at the start of August, through St. Petersburg she left for Kuokkala, then part of the Grand Duchy of Finland (which was an autonomous part of the Russian Empire). From there, in the middle of September, she managed to secretly flee to Germany.

Germany 

Luxemburg wanted to move to Germany to be at the centre of the party struggle, but she had no way of obtaining permission to remain there indefinitely. In April 1897 she married the son of an old friend, Gustav Lübeck, in order to gain German citizenship. They never lived together and they formally divorced five years later. She returned briefly to Paris, then moved permanently to Berlin to begin her fight for Eduard Bernstein's constitutional reform movement. Luxemburg hated the stifling conservatism of Berlin. She despised Prussian men and resented what she saw as the grip of urban capitalism on social democracy. In the Social Democratic Party of Germany's women's section, she met Clara Zetkin, whom she made a lifelong friend. Between 1907 and his conscription in 1915, she was involved in a love affair with Clara's younger son, Kostja Zetkin, to whom approximately 600 surviving letters (now mostly published) bear testimony. Luxemburg was a member of the uncompromising left-wing of the SPD. Their clear position was that the objectives of liberation for the industrial working class and all minorities could be achieved by revolution only.

The recently published Letters of Rosa Luxemburg shed important light on her life in Germany. As Irene Gammel writes in a review of the English translation of the book in The Globe and Mail: "The three decades covered by the 230 letters in this collection provide the context for her major contributions as a political activist, socialist theorist and writer". Her reputation was tarnished by Joseph Stalin's cynicism in Questions Concerning the History of Bolshevism. In his rewriting of Russian events, he placed the blame for the theory of permanent revolution on Luxemburg's shoulders, with faint praise for her attacks on Karl Kautsky which she commenced in 1910.

According to Gammel, "In her controversial tome of 1913, The Accumulation of Capital, as well as through her work as a co-founder of the radical Spartacus League, Luxemburg helped to shape Germany's young democracy by advancing an international, rather than a nationalist, outlook. This farsightedness partly explains her remarkable popularity as a socialist icon and its continued resonance in movies, novels and memorials dedicated to her life and oeuvre". Gammel also notes that for Luxemburg "the revolution was a way of life" and yet that the letters also challenge the stereotype of "Red Rosa" as a ruthless fighter. However, The Accumulation of Capital sparked angry accusations from the Communist Party of Germany. In 1923, Ruth Fischer and Arkadi Maslow denounced the work as "errors", a derivative work of economic miscalculation known as "spontaneity".

Luxemburg continued to identify as Polish and disliked living in Germany, which she saw as a political necessity, making various negative comments about contemporary German society in her private correspondence that was written in Polish; at the same time, she loved the works of Johann Wolfgang von Goethe and showed an appreciation for German literature. However, she also preferred Switzerland to Berlin and greatly missed being around the Polish language and culture.

Before World War I 
When Luxemburg moved to Germany in May 1898, she settled in Berlin. She was active there in the left wing of the SPD in which she sharply defined the border between the views of her faction and the revisionism theory of Eduard Bernstein. She attacked him in her brochure Social Reform or Revolution?, released in September 1898. Luxemburg's rhetorical skill made her a leading spokesperson in denouncing the SPD's reformist parliamentary course. She argued that the critical difference between capital and labour could only be countered if the proletariat assumed power and effected revolutionary changes in methods of production. She wanted the revisionists ousted from the SPD. That did not occur, but Kautsky's leadership retained a Marxist influence on its programme.

From 1900, Luxemburg published analyses of contemporary European socio-economic problems in newspapers. Foreseeing war, she vigorously attacked what she saw as German militarism and imperialism. Luxemburg wanted a general strike to rouse the workers to solidarity and prevent the coming war. However, the SPD leaders refused and she broke with Kautsky in 1910. Between 1904 and 1906, she was imprisoned for her political activities on three occasions. In 1907, she went to the Russian Social Democrats' Fifth Party Day in London, where she met Vladimir Lenin. At the socialist Second International Congress in Stuttgart, her resolution demanding that all European workers' parties should unite in attempting to stop the war was accepted.

Luxemburg taught Marxism and economics at the SPD's Berlin training centre. Her former student Friedrich Ebert became the SPD leader and later the Weimar Republic's first President. In 1912, Luxemburg was the SPD representative at the European Socialists' congresses. With French socialist Jean Jaurès, Luxemburg argued that European workers' parties should organise a general strike when war broke out. In 1913, she told a large meeting: "If they think we are going to lift the weapons of murder against our French and other brethren, then we shall shout: 'We will not do it! However, when nationalist crises in the Balkans erupted into violence and then the war in 1914, there was no general strike and the SPD majority supported the war as did the French Socialists. The Reichstag unanimously agreed to finance the war. The SPD voted in favour of that and agreed to a truce with the Imperial government, promising to refrain from any strikes during the war. This led Luxemburg to contemplate suicide as the revisionism she had fought since 1899 had triumphed.

In response, Luxemburg organised anti-war demonstrations in Frankfurt, calling for conscientious objection to military conscription and the refusal to obey orders. On that account, she was imprisoned for a year for "inciting to disobedience against the authorities' law and order". Shortly after her death, her fame was alluded to by Grigory Zinoviev at the Petrograd Soviet on 18 January 1919 as he adjudged her astute assessment of Bolshevism.

During the war 

They wrote illegal anti-war pamphlets pseudonymously signed Spartacus after the slave-liberating Thracian gladiator who opposed the Romans. Luxemburg's pseudonym was Junius, after Lucius Junius Brutus, founder of the Roman Republic. The Spartacus League vehemently rejected the SPD's support in the Reichstag for funding the war, and urged Germany's labor unions to declare an anti-war general strike. As a result, Luxemburg and Liebknecht were imprisoned in June 1916 for two and a half years. During imprisonment, Luxemburg was twice relocated, first to Posen (now Poznań), then to Breslau (now Wrocław).

Luxemburg continued to write and friends secretly smuggled out and illegally published her articles. Among them was Die Russische Revolution, criticising the Bolsheviks and accusing them of seeking to impose a totalitarian single party state upon the Soviet Union. In that context, she wrote the infamous dictum  ("Freedom is always the freedom of the one who thinks differently") and continues in the same chapter: "The public life of countries with limited freedom is so poverty-stricken, so miserable, so rigid, so unfruitful, precisely because, through the exclusion of democracy, it cuts off the living sources of all spiritual riches and progress".

In 1917, the Spartacus League was affiliated with the Independent Social Democratic Party (USPD), founded by Hugo Haase and made up of anti-war former SPD members.

According to Russian historian Edvard Radzinsky, "The Bolshevik envoy in Berlin began secretly purchasing arms for the German revolutionaries. A little while ago the Germans had been assisting revolution in Russia. Now Lenin was reciprocating. The Bolshevik embassy became the headquarters of the German revolution."

In November 1918, the USPD and the SPD assumed power in the newly created Weimar Republic, which many subsequent historians have critically termed, "a Republic without republicans", upon the 9 November abdication of Emperor Wilhelm II. This followed the German Revolution that began with the Kiel mutiny, when workers' and soldiers' councils seized most of Germany to put an end to World War I and to the monarchy.

German Revolution of 1918–1919 

Luxemburg was freed from prison in Breslau on 8 November 1918, three days before the armistice of 11 November 1918. One day later, Karl Liebknecht, who had also been freed from prison, proclaimed the Free Socialist Republic in Berlin. He and Luxemburg reorganised the Spartacus League and founded The Red Flag newspaper, demanding amnesty for all political prisoners and the abolition of capital punishment in the essay Against Capital Punishment. On 14 December 1918, they published the new programme of the Spartacus League.

From 29 to 31 December 1918, they took part in a joint congress of the League, independent socialists and the International Communists of Germany (IKD) that led to the foundation on 1 January 1919 of the Communist Party of Germany (KPD) under the leadership of Liebknecht and Luxemburg. Luxemburg supported the new KPD's participation in the Weimar National Assembly that founded the Weimar Republic, but she was out-voted and the KPD boycotted the elections.

In January 1919, a second revolutionary wave swept Berlin. On New Year's Day, Luxemburg declared:

Today we can seriously set about destroying capitalism once and for all. Nay, more; not merely are we today in a position to perform this task, nor merely is its performance a duty toward the proletariat, but our solution offers the only means of saving human society from destruction.

Like Liebknecht, Luxemburg supported the violent  attempt. The Red Flag encouraged the rebels to occupy the editorial offices of the liberal press and later, all positions of power. On 8 January, Luxemburg's Red Flag printed a public statement by her, in which she called for revolutionary violence and no negotiations with the revolution's "mortal enemies", the Friedrich Ebert-Philipp Scheidemann government.

Assassination and aftermath 
Meanwhile, Luxemburg's Red Flag falsely claimed that the rebellion was spreading across Germany.

The unit's officer commanding, Captain Waldemar Pabst, with Lieutenant Horst von Pflugk-Harttung, questioned them under torture and then gave the order to summarily execute them. Luxemburg was first knocked down with a rifle butt by Pvt. Otto Runge, then shot in the head as a coup de grace, either by Lieutenant Kurt Vogel or by Lieutenant Hermann Souchon. Her body was then flung into Berlin's Landwehr Canal. In the Tiergarten, Liebknecht was shot and his body, without a name, brought to a morgue.

The assassinations of Luxemburg and Liebknecht were the beginning of a new wave of paramilitary violence in Berlin and across Germany. Thousands of members of the KPD as well as other revolutionaries and civilians were killed, often as collateral damage. Finally, the People's Navy Division and workers' and soldiers' unions, which had moved to the political far left, were disbanded.

The last part of the German Revolution saw many instances of armed violence and strike action throughout Germany. Significant strikes occurred in Berlin, the Bremen Soviet Republic, Saxony, Saxe-Gotha, Hamburg, the Rhinelands and the Ruhr region. Last to strike was the Bavarian Soviet Republic which was suppressed on 2 May 1919.

More than four months after the murders of Luxemburg and Liebknecht, on 1 June 1919, Luxemburg's corpse was found and identified after an autopsy at the Charité hospital in Berlin.

According to Russian historian Edvard Radzinsky, Soviet Premier Vladimir Lenin retaliated for Liebknecht and Luxemburg's murder by issuing orders to Gregory Zinoviev for the immediate arrest and summary execution of four Grand Dukes from the recently deposed House of Romanov, all of whom were uncles of the last Tsar. Despite the pleas of Maxim Gorky on behalf of one of the condemned, the known progressive and noted historian Grand Duke Nikolai Mikhailovich, all four men were shot on 30 January 1919 at the Peter and Paul Fortress in Petrograd. The other three victims were the Grand Duke George Mikhailovich, the Grand Duke Paul Alexandrovich and the Grand Duke Dmitri Constantinovich.

Pvt. Otto Runge was sentenced to two years imprisonment (for "attempted manslaughter") and Lieutenant Vogel to four months (for failing to report a corpse). However, Vogel escaped after a brief custody. Captain Pabst and Lt. Souchon were never prosecuted. The Nazis later compensated Pvt. Runge for having been jailed, but he died in Berlin in NKVD custody after the end of World War II. The Nazis also later merged the  into the SA. In an interview with German news magazine Der Spiegel in 1962 and again in his memoirs, Captain Pabst alleged that Defence Minister Gustav Noske and Weimar Republic Chancellor Friedrich Ebert, had both covertly approved of his actions. His account has been neither confirmed nor disproven since the case has not been examined by parliament or the courts. In 1993, Gietinger's research on his access to the previously restricted papers of Pabst, held at the Federal Military Archives, found him as central to the planning of the murder of Luxemburg and the shielding of those who acted under his orders from subsequent criminal prosecution.

Annual demonstration
In East Germany, the event was widely considered to be a mere show for Socialist Unity Party of Germany politicians and celebrities, which was broadcast live on state television.

During the Peaceful Revolution, the annual parade in East Berlin honoring the deaths of Liebknecht and Luxemburg was used by East German dissidents as part of their campaign, "to raise their unwelcome demands at embarrassing moments for the regime". On January 17, 1988, as Premier Erich Honecker was reviewing the parade, a group of dissidents broke through the ranks of the Free German Youth and unfurled banners bearing Rosa Luxemburg's infamous dictum from Die Russische Revolution, "Freiheit ist immer die Freiheit des Andersdenkenden" ("True freedom is always the freedom of the non-conformists!") Viewers of the parade were then subjected to the deeply ironic sight of Stasi agents savagely beating up and arresting everyone who brandished the slogan.

In January 2019, the German left-wing parties commemorated at the occasion of this demonstration the 100th anniversary of the summary execution of Luxemburg and Liebknecht.

Thought

Revolutionary socialist democracy 

Luxemburg professed a commitment to democracy and the necessity of revolution. Luxemburg's idea of democracy which Stanley Aronowitz calls "generalized democracy in an unarticulated form" represents Luxemburg's greatest break with "mainstream communism" since it effectively diminishes the role of the communist party, but it is in fact very similar to the views of Karl Marx ("The emancipation of the working classes must be conquered by the working classes themselves"). According to Aronowitz, the vagueness of Luxemburgian democracy is one reason for its initial difficulty in gaining widespread support. Luxemburg herself clarified her position on democracy in her writings regarding the Russian Revolution and the Soviet Union. Early on, Luxemburg attacked undemocratic tendencies present in the Russian Revolution:

Luxemburg also insisted on socialist democracy:

Freedom only for the supporters of the government, only for the members of one party – however numerous they may be – is no freedom at all. Freedom is always and exclusively freedom for the one who thinks differently. Not because of any fanatical concept of "justice" but because all that is instructive, wholesome and purifying in political freedom depends on this essential characteristic, and its effectiveness vanishes when "freedom" becomes a special privilege. [...] But socialist democracy is not something which begins only in the promised land after the foundations of socialist economy are created; it does not come as some sort of Christmas present for the worthy people who, in the interim, have loyally supported a handful of socialist dictators. Socialist democracy begins simultaneously with the beginnings of the destruction of class rule and of the construction of socialism.

The Accumulation of Capital 

The Accumulation of Capital was the only work Luxemburg officially published on economics during her lifetime. In the polemic, she argued that capitalism needs to constantly expand into non-capitalist areas in order to access new supply sources, markets for surplus value and reservoirs of labour. According to Luxemburg, capitalists sought to realise profits through offloading surplus commodities onto non-capitalist economies, hence the phenomenon of imperialism as capitalist states sought to dominate weaker economies. However, this was leading to the destruction of non-capitalist economies as they were increasingly absorbed into the capitalist system. With the destruction of non-capitalist economies, there would be no more markets to offload surplus commodities onto and capitalism would break down.

The Accumulation of Capital was harshly criticised by both Marxist and non-Marxist economists on the grounds that her logic was circular in proclaiming the impossibility of realising profits in a close-capitalist system and that her underconsumptionist theory was too crude. Her conclusion that the limits of the capitalist system drive it to imperialism and war led Luxemburg to a lifetime of campaigning against militarism and colonialism.

Dialectic of Spontaneity and Organisation 

The Dialectic of Spontaneity and Organisation was the central feature of Luxemburg's political philosophy, wherein spontaneity is a grassroots approach to organising a party-oriented class struggle. She argued that spontaneity and organisation are not separable or separate activities, but different moments of one political process as one does not exist without the other. These beliefs arose from her view that class struggle evolves from an elementary, spontaneous state to a higher level:

The working classes in every country only learn to fight in the course of their struggles. [...] Social democracy [...] is only the advance guard of the proletariat, a small piece of the total working masses; blood from their blood, and flesh from their flesh. Social democracy seeks and finds the ways, and particular slogans, of the workers' struggle only in the course of the development of this struggle, and gains directions for the way forward through this struggle alone.

Luxemburg did not hold spontaneism as an abstraction, but she developed the Dialectic of Spontaneity and Organisation under the influence of mass strikes in Europe, especially the Russian Revolution of 1905. Unlike the social democratic orthodoxy of the Second International, she did not regard organisation as a product of scientific-theoretic insight to historical imperatives, but as product of the working classes' struggles:

Social democracy is simply the embodiment of the modern proletariat's class struggle, a struggle which is driven by a consciousness of its own historic consequences. The masses are in reality their own leaders, dialectically creating their own development process. The more that social democracy develops, grows, and becomes stronger, the more the enlightened masses of workers will take their own destinies, the leadership of their movement, and the determination of its direction into their own hands. And as the entire social democracy movement is only the conscious advance guard of the proletarian class movement, which in the words of The Communist Manifesto represent in every single moment of the struggle the permanent interests of liberation and the partial group interests of the workforce  the interests of the movement as whole, so within the social democracy its leaders are the more powerful, the more influential, the more clearly and consciously they make themselves merely the mouthpiece of the will and striving of the enlightened masses, merely the agents of the objective laws of the class movement.

Luxemburg also argued:

The modern proletarian class does not carry out its struggle according to a plan set out in some book or theory; the modern workers' struggle is a part of history, a part of social progress, and in the middle of history, in the middle of progress, in the middle of the fight, we learn how we must fight. [...] That's exactly what is laudable about it, that's exactly why this colossal piece of culture, within the modern workers' movement, is epoch-defining: that the great masses of the working people first forge from their own consciousness, from their own belief, and even from their own understanding the weapons of their own liberation.

Criticism of the October Revolution 
In an article published just before the October Revolution, Luxemburg characterised the Russian February Revolution of 1917 as a "revolution of the proletariat" and said that the "liberal bourgeoisie" were pushed to movement by the display of "proletarian power". The task of the Russian proletariat, she said, was now to end the "imperialist" world war in addition to struggling against the "imperialist bourgeoisie". The world war made Russia ripe for a socialist revolution. Therefore, "the German proletariat are also [...] posed a question of honour, and a very fateful question".

In several works, including an essay written from jail and published posthumously by her last companion Paul Levi (publication of which precipitated his expulsion from the Third International), titled The Russian Revolution, Luxemburg sharply criticised some Bolshevik policies such as their suppression of the Constituent Assembly in January 1918 and their policy of supporting the purported right of all national peoples to self-determination. According to Luxemburg, the Bolsheviks' strategic mistakes created tremendous dangers for the Revolution such as its bureaucratisation.

Her sharp criticism of the October Revolution and the Bolsheviks was lessened insofar as she compared the errors of the Revolution and of the Bolsheviks with the "complete failure of the international proletariat".

Bolshevik theorists such as Vladimir Lenin and Leon Trotsky responded to this criticism by arguing that Luxemburg's notions were classical Marxist ones, but they could not be applied to Russia of 1917. They stated that the lessons of actual experience such as the confrontation with the bourgeois parties had forced them to revise the Marxian strategy. As part of this argument, it was pointed out that after Luxemburg herself got out of jail, she was also forced to confront the National Assembly in Germany, a step they compared with their own conflict with the Russian Constituent Assembly.

In this erupting of the social divide in the very lap of bourgeois society, in this international deepening and heightening of class antagonism lies the historical merit of Bolshevism, and with this feat – as always in large historic connections – the particular mistakes and errors of the Bolsheviks disappear without trace.

After the October Revolution, it becomes the "historic responsibility" of the German workers to carry out a revolution for themselves and thereby end the war. When the German Revolution also broke out, Luxemburg immediately began agitating for a social revolution:

The abolition of the rule of capital, the realization of a socialist social order – this, and nothing less, is the historical theme of the present revolution. It is a formidable undertaking, and one that will not be accomplished in the blink of an eye just by the issuing of a few decrees from above. Only through the conscious action of the working masses in city and country can it be brought to life, only through the people's highest intellectual maturity and inexhaustible idealism can it be brought safely through all storms and find its way to port.

In her later work The Russian Tragedy, Luxemburg blamed many of the perceived failures of the Bolsheviks on the lack of a socialist uprising in Germany:

The Bolsheviks have certainly made a number of mistakes in their policies and are perhaps still making them – but where is the revolution in which no mistakes have been made! The notion of a revolutionary policy without mistakes, and moreover, in a totally unprecedented situation, is so absurd that it is worthy only of a German schoolmaster. If the so-called leaders of German socialism lose their so-called heads in such an unusual situation as a vote in the Reichstag, and if their hearts sink into their boots and they forget all the socialism they ever learned in situation in which the simple abc of socialism clearly pointed the way – could one expect a party caught up in a truly thorny situation, in which it would show the world new wonders, not to make mistakes?

Luxemburg further stated:

The awkward position that the Bolsheviks are in today, however, is, together with most of their mistakes, a consequence of basic insolubility of the problem posed to them by the international, above all the German, proletariat. To carry out the dictatorship of the proletariat and a socialist revolution in a single country surrounded by reactionary imperialist rule and in the fury of the bloodiest world war in human history – that is squaring the circle. Any socialist party would have to fail in this task and perish – whether or not it made self-renunciation the guiding star of its policies.

Luxemburg also considered a socialist uprising in Germany to be the solution to the problems the Bolsheviks faced:

There is only one solution to the tragedy in which Russia is caught up: an uprising at the rear of German imperialism, the German mass rising, which can signal the international revolution to put an end to this genocide. At this fateful moment, preserving the honour of the Russian Revolution is identical with vindicating that of the German proletariat and of international socialists.

Epitaph on her death 
Lenin praised Luxemburg after her death as an "eagle" of the working class:

But in spite of her mistakes she wasand remains for usan eagle. And not only will communists all over the world cherish her memory, but her biography and her complete works (the publication of which the German communists are inordinately delaying, which can only be partly excused by the tremendous losses they are suffering in their severe struggle) will serve as useful manuals for training many generations of communists all over the world. 'Since 4 August 1914, German Social-Democracy has been a stinking corpse'this statement will make Rosa Luxemburg's name famous in the history of the international working class movement.

Trotsky also publicly mourned Luxemburg's death:

We have suffered two heavy losses at once which merge into one enormous bereavement. There have been struck down from our ranks two leaders whose names will be for ever entered in the great book of the proletarian revolution: Karl Liebknecht and Rosa Luxemburg. They have perished. They have been killed. They are no longer with us!

In later years, Trotsky frequently defended Luxemburg, claiming that Joseph Stalin had vilified her. In the article "Hands Off Rosa Luxemburg!", Trotsky criticised Stalin for this despite what Trotsky perceived as Luxemburg's theoretical errors, writing: "Yes, Stalin has sufficient cause to hate Rosa Luxemburg. But all the more imperious therefore becomes our duty to shield Rosa's memory from Stalin's calumny that has been caught by the hired functionaries of both hemispheres, and to pass on this truly beautiful, heroic, and tragic image to the young generations of the proletariat in all its grandeur and inspirational force".

Quotations 
 Luxemburg's perhaps best-known quotation "" (sometimes translated as "Freedom is always the freedom of dissenters") is an excerpt from the following passage:

Freedom only for the supporters of the government, only for the members of a party – however numerous they may be – is no freedom at all. Freedom is always the freedom of the one who thinks differently. Not because of the fanaticism of "justice", but rather because all that is instructive, wholesome, and purifying in political freedom depends on this essential characteristic, and its effects cease to work when "freedom" becomes a privilege.
 "The capitalist state of society is doubtless a historic necessity, but so also is the revolt of the working class against it – the revolt of its gravediggers." (April 1915)
 "Without general elections, without unrestricted freedom of press and assembly, without a free struggle of opinion, life dies out in every public institution, becomes a mere semblance of life, in which only the bureaucracy remains as the active element."
 "For us there is no minimal and no maximal program; socialism is one and the same thing: this is the minimum we have to realize today."
 "Today, we face the choice exactly as Friedrich Engels foresaw it a generation ago: either the triumph of imperialism and the collapse of all civilization as in ancient Rome, depopulation, desolation, degeneration – a great cemetery. Or the victory of socialism, that means the conscious active struggle of the international proletariat against imperialism and its method of war."
 "Most of those bourgeois women who act like lionesses in the struggle against 'male prerogatives' would trot like docile lambs in the camp of conservative and clerical reaction if they had suffrage." (Luxemburg's famous observation and critique of liberal feminism)
"Imperialism is the political expression of the accumulation of capital in its competitive struggle for what remains still open of the non-capitalist environment."

Last words: belief in revolution 
Luxemburg's last known words written on the evening of her murder were about her belief in the masses and what she saw as the inevitability of a triumphant revolution:

Legacy

Poland

In spite of her own Polish nationality and strong ties to Polish culture, her opposition to the independence of the Second Polish Republic and later criticism from Stalinists have made Róza Luksemburg a controversial historical figure in the modern Third Polish Republic's political discourse.

After the transformation and change of regime, the factory was privatised in 1991 and then split up into four different companies; the factory buildings were sold by 1993 and fell into disuse in 1994.

A street in Szprotawa used to be named after Luksemburg until it was changed to ulica Różana (Rose street) in September 2018. Many other streets and locations in Poland either used to be or still are named after Róża Luksemburg, such as those in Warsaw, Gliwice, Będzin, Szprotawa, Lublin, Polkowice, Łódź, etc.

Efforts to put up commemorative plaques in memory of Luksemburg have taken place in a number of Polish cities, such as Poznań and her birthplace Zamość. A 45-minute-long sightseeing tour around areas associated with the life of the Polish revolutionary was organised in Warsaw in 2019, where a statue of Róża by Alfred Jesion was also put on display at the Warsaw Citadel as part of the Gallery of Polish Sculpture of the 1950s.

The commemorative plaque in Poznań, in memory of Luksemburg, that is on the building she lived in during May 1903 was vandalised with paint in 2013. An official petition was started in 2021 to name a square in Wrocław after her, but the local government rejected the proposal.

Germany

In 1919, Bertolt Brecht wrote the poetic memorial Epitaph honouring Luxemburg and Kurt Weill set it to music in The Berlin Requiem in 1928:

Red Rosa now has vanished too,
And where she lies is hid from view.
She told the poor what life's about,
And so the rich have rubbed her out.
May she rest in peace.

The famous Monument to Rosa Luxemburg and Karl Liebknecht, originally named Monument to the November Revolution which was designed by pioneering modernist and later Bauhaus director Ludwig Mies van der Rohe and built in 1926 in Berlin-Lichtenberg and destroyed in 1935. The memorial took the form of a suprematist composition of brick masses. Van der Rohe said: "As most of these people [Rosa Luxemburg, Karl Liebknecht and other fallen heroes of the Revolution] were shot in front of a brick wall, a brick wall would be what I would build as a monument". The commission came about through the offices of Eduard Fuchs, who showed a proposal featuring Doric columns and medallions of Liebknecht and Luxemburg, prompting Mies' laughter and the comment "That would be a good monument for a banker". The monument was destroyed by the Nazis after they took power.

In the former East Germany and East Berlin, various places were named for Luxemburg by the East German communist party. These include the Rosa-Luxemburg-Platz and a U-Bahn station which were located in East Berlin during the Cold War.

An engraving on the nearby pavement reads "Ich war, ich bin, ich werde sein" ("I was, I am, I will be"). The Volksbühne (People's Theatre) is also on Rosa-Luxemburg-Platz.

Following the 1989 Peaceful Revolution and German reunification, CDU delegates on the Berlin city council recommended renaming all streets and squares honoring Karl Marx, August Bebel, Karl Liebknecht, Rosa Luxemburg, and Clara Zetkin. In a rare moment of agreement, both PDS and SPD delegates balked at this and the battle became so heated that an independent commission was appointed to advise on the question. The commission ultimately recommended the compromise, "that Communists who had died too soon to help bring Weimar down, or the GDR up, should not be purged". For this reason, both streets and squares in the former East Berlin continue to bear Rosa Luxemburg's name.

Dresden has a street and streetcar stop named after Luxemburg. The names remained unchanged after the German reunification.

On the memorial, the name Rosa Luxemburg appears in raised capital letters, marking the spot where her body was thrown into the canal by  troops.

The Federal Office for the Protection of the Constitution notes that idolisation of Luxemburg and Liebnecht remains an important tradition of far-left extremism in the Federal Republic of Germany. During the Cold War, Luxemburg and Liebknecht were idolised as martyrs by East Germany's ruling Party and continue to be idolised by its successor party: The Left.

Russia
Opponents and critics of the far-left have often had a very different interpretation of Luxemburg's murder. Russian historian Edvard Radzinsky has gone on the record as a very harsh critic of the Soviet Government for spending so much money abroad to fund the efforts of those like Liebknecht and Luxemburg to covertly destabilise and overthrow the Weimar Republic and other Western Governments. In the Soviet Union during the same time, mass starvation was taking place, first due to Vladimir Lenin's policy of War Communism and then to the Russian famine of 1921. According to Radzinsky, "Starving Moscow was feeding the Communist Parties of the whole world. People were swollen with hunger, but never mind, the world revolution was at hand."

In a 1922 conversation with Count Harry Kessler, one such refugee lamented:

Infamous, that fifteen thousand Russian officers should have let themselves be slaughtered by the Revolution without raising a hand in self-defense! Why didn't they act like the Germans, who killed Rosa Luxemburg in such a way that not even a smell of her has remained?

Elsewhere
Pavlivska Square in Kharkiv used to be called "площадь Розы Люксембург" (in Russian) and "майдан Рози Люксембург" (in Ukrainian). A street in Donetsk is still named after her, as well as another in Minsk and a number in Russia.

The British New Left historian Isaac Deutscher wrote of Luxemburg: "In her assassination Hohenzollern Germany celebrated its last triumph and Nazi Germany its first".

In Barcelona, there are terraced gardens named after her. In Madrid, there is a street and several public schools and associations named after Luxemburg. Other Spanish cities including Gijón, Getafe or Arganda del Rey have streets named after her.

There is also a monument in Luxembourg for "Lady Rosa" created by Sanja Iveković.

A street in Vienna has been named in Rosa Luxemburg's honour since 1947.

Two small international networks based on her political thought characterise themselves as Luxemburgists, namely the Communist Democracy (Luxemburgist) founded in 2005 and the International Luxemburgist Network founded in 2008. Feminists and Trotskyists as well as leftists in Germany especially show interest in Luxemburg's ideas. Distinguished modern Marxist thinkers such as Ernest Mandel, who has even been characterised as Luxemburgist, have seen Luxemburg's thought as a corrective to revolutionary theory. In 2002, ten thousand people marched in Berlin for Luxemburg and Liebknecht and another 90,000 people laid carnations on their graves.

In popular culture and literature 
Due to Luxemburg's importance in the development of theories of Marxist humanist thought, the role of democracy and mass action to achieve international socialism as a pioneering advocate of workers' rights, gender equality, and as a martyr to her cause, she has become a minor iconic figure, celebrated with references in popular culture.

 Bulgarian writer Hristo Smirnenski, who praised communist ideology, wrote the poem "Rosa Luxemburg" in tribute to Luxemburg in 1923.
 Rosa Luxemburg (1986), directed by Margarethe von Trotta. The film, which stars Barbara Sukowa as Luxemburg, was the winner of the Best Actress Award at the 1986 Cannes Film Festival.
 In 1992, the Quebec painter Jean-Paul Riopelle realised a fresco composed of thirty paintings entitled Tribute to Rosa Luxemburg. It is on permanent display at the National Museum of Fine Arts of Quebec in Quebec City.
 Luxemburg influences the lives of several characters in William T. Vollmann's 2005 historical fiction Europe Central.
 Rosa, a novel by Jonathan Rabb (2005), gives a fictional account of the events leading to Luxemburg's murder.
 The heroine in the novel Burger's Daughter (1979) by Nadine Gordimer is named Rosa Burger in homage to Luxemburg.
 Harry Turtledove's Southern Victory series of alternate history novels contains an American socialist politician character named Flora Hamburger, a reference to the real historical personage of Luxemburg.
 Simon Louvish's 1994 alternate history novel The Resurrections (from Four Walls Eight Windows, a revision of Resurrections from the Dustbin of History: A Political Fantasy), had Luxemburg and Liebknecht avoid death, their revolution becoming reality in 1923 when a failed Reichstag coup by Gregor and Otto Strasser (plotted by the Black Reichswehr's Bruno Ernst Buchrucker) killed Gustav Stresemann, Wilhelm Cuno, Hans von Seeckt and 17 deputies followed by the Marxists creating a Berlin commune whose squads executed the Strassers and any Nazis not already in exile, the Reichswehr then disarming the Freikorps and accepting a German Soviet Republic's legitimacy, with Liebknecht as Minister of the Interior.
 The pet tortoise at Balliol College, Oxford was named in honour of Luxemburg. She went missing in spring 2004.
 A song on the 1997 album Morskaya of the Russian rock band Mumiy Troll is titled in her honor.
 Langston Hughes alludes to her death in the poem "Kids Who Die" in the line "Or the rivers where you're drowned like Liebknecht".
 Luxemburg appears in Karl and Rosa, a novel by Alfred Döblin.
 She also appears in the novel Time and Time Again by Ben Elton.
 Red Rosa is a graphic novelisation by Kate Evans.
 German artist Max Beckmann in his post WWI lithograph Das Martyrium depicts Luxemburg's murder as a sexual assault, her clothes torn, her underwear revealed, one soldier fondling her left breast; another smirking while aiming his rifle butt at her right breast, the hotel manager holding her legs apart. There is no historical justification for this depiction. Tellini in Woman's Art Journal 1997 argues both the sensationalising aspect of graphic sexual assault as well as the artist's misogyny were probably responsible.
 The song Strange Time To Bloom, written by Nancy Kerr, "For Rosa Luxemburg, March 1871 – January 1919" appears on the 2019 Melrose Quartet album The Rudolph Variations.
 The feminist magazine Lux, which began in 2020, says that it is named for Rosa Luxemburg, describing her as "one of the most creative minds to remake the socialist tradition".
 Canadian author Kyo Maclear wrote in her 2017 book Birds, Art, Life: A year of observation about the pleasure that Luxemburg took when she was in prison from hearing and seeing birds, based on Luxemburg's letters from prison.

Body identification controversy 

On 29 May 2009, Spiegel online, the internet branch of the news magazine Der Spiegel, reported the recently considered possibility that someone else's remains had mistakenly been identified as Luxemburg's and buried as hers.

The forensic pathologist Michael Tsokos, head of the Institute of Legal Medicine and Forensic Sciences at the Berlin Charité, discovered a preserved corpse lacking head, feet, or hands in the cellar of the Charité's medical history museum. He found the corpse's autopsy report suspicious and decided to perform a CT scan on the remains. The body showed signs of having been waterlogged at some point and the scans showed that it was the body of a woman of 40–50 years of age who suffered from osteoarthritis and had legs of differing length. At the time of her murder, Luxemburg was 47 years old and suffering from a congenital dislocation of the hip that caused her legs to have different lengths. A laboratory in Kiel also tested the corpse using radiocarbon dating techniques and confirmed that it dated from the same period as Luxemburg's murder.

The original autopsy, performed on 13 June 1919 on the body that was eventually buried at Friedrichsfelde, showed certain inconsistencies that supported Tsokos' hypothesis. The autopsy explicitly noted an absence of hip damage and stated that there was no evidence that the legs were of different lengths. Additionally, the autopsy showed no traces on the upper skull of the two blows by rifle butt inflicted upon Luxemburg. Finally, while the 1919 examiners noted a hole in the corpse's head between the left eye and ear, they did not find an exit wound or the presence of a bullet within the skull.

Assistant pathologist Paul Fraenckel appeared to doubt at the time that the corpse he had examined was Luxemburg's and in a signed addendum distanced himself from his colleague's conclusions. This addendum and the inconsistencies between the autopsy report and the known facts persuaded Tsokos to examine the remains more closely. According to eyewitnesses, when Luxemburg's body was thrown into the canal, weights were wired to her ankles and wrists. These could have slowly severed her extremities in the months her corpse spent in the water which would explain the missing hands and feet issue.

Tsokos realised that DNA testing was the best way to confirm or deny the identity of the body as Luxemburg's. His team had initially hoped to find traces of the DNA on old postage stamps that Luxemburg had licked, but it transpired that Luxemburg had never done this, preferring to moisten stamps with a damp cloth. The examiners decided to look for a surviving blood relative and in July 2009 the German Sunday newspaper Bild am Sonntag reported that a great-niece of Luxemburg had been locateda 79-year-old woman named Irene Borde. She donated strands of her hair for DNA comparison.

In December 2009, Berlin authorities seized the corpse to perform an autopsy before burying it in Luxemburg's grave. The Berlin Public Prosecutor's office announced in late December 2009 that while there were indications that the corpse was Luxemburg's, there was not enough evidence to provide conclusive proof. In particular, DNA extracted from the hair of Luxemburg's niece did not match that belonging to the cadaver. Tsokos had earlier said that the chances of a match were only 40%. The remains were to be buried at an undisclosed location while testing was to continue on tissue samples.

Works 
 The Accumulation of Capital, translated by Agnes Schwarzschild in 1951. Routledge Classics 2003 edition. Originally published as Die Akkumulation des Kapitals in 1913.
 The Accumulation of Capital: an Anticritique, written in 1915.
 Gesammelte Werke (Collected Works), 5 volumes, Berlin, 1970–1975.
 Gesammelte Briefe (Collected Letters), 6 volumes, Berlin, 1982–1997.
 Politische Schriften (Political Writings), edited and with preface by Ossip K. Flechtheim, 3 volumes, Frankfurt am Main, 1966 ff.
 The Complete Works of Rosa Luxemburg, 14 volumes, London and New York, 2011.
 The Rosa Luxemburg Reader, edited by Peter Hudis and Kevin B. Anderson.

Writings 
This is a list of selected writings:

Speeches

See also 

 Proletarian internationalism
 Rosa Luxemburg Foundation
 List of peace activists
 Clara Zetkin
 Nadezhda Krupskaya
 Alexandra Kollontai

Citations

Bibliography 

 
 
 
 
 
 
 
 
 
 
 
 Joffre-Eichhorn, Hjalmar Jorge (2021, ed.), Post Rosa: Letters against Barbarism. Rosa Luxemburg Stiftung: New York.
 Kemmerer, Alexandra (2016), "Editing Rosa: Luxemburg, the Revolution, and the Politics of Infantilization". European Journal of International Law, Vol. 27 (3), 853–864. 
 
 
  It is long considered the definitive biography of Luxemburg.
 
 
 Weitz, Eric D. (1997). Creating German Communism, 1890–1990: From Popular Protests to Socialist State. Princeton, New Jersey: Princeton University Press.
 Priestand, David (2009). Red Flag: A History of Communism. New York: Grove Press.
 Weitz, Eric D. (1994). "'Rosa Luxemburg Belongs to Us!'" German Communism and the Luxemburg Legacy. Central European History (27: 1). pp. 27–64.
 Evans, Kate (2015). Red Rosa: A Graphic Biography of Rosa Luxemburg. New York: Verso.
 Luban, Ottokar (2017). The Role of the Spartacist Group after 9 November 1918 and the Formation of the KPD. In Hoffrogge, Ralf; LaPorte, Norman (eds.). Weimar Communism as Mass Movement 1918–1933. London: Lawrence & Wishart. pp. 45–65.

Further reading

External links 

 Rosa Luxemburg at the Marxists Internet Archive
 Rosa Luxemburg Foundation
 Jörn Schütrumpf Rosa Luxemburg or: The Price of Freedom
 Socialist Studies Special Issue on Rosa Luxembourg
 Rosa Luxemburg: Revolutionary Hero
 Rosa Luxemburg: A Socialist With a Human Face
 Rosa Luxemburg: "The War and the Workers" (1916)
 German Corpse 'may be Luxemburg', BBC News, 29 May 2009
 Revolutionary Rosa: The Letters of Rosa Luxemburg, reviewed by Irene Gammel for the Globe and Mail
 Luxemburg-Jacob papers at the Online Archive of California
 
 
 
 
 

 
1871 births
1919 deaths
20th-century Polish women politicians
20th-century Polish philosophers
19th-century German women writers
19th-century Polish politicians
19th-century Polish women writers
19th-century philosophers
20th-century German philosophers
20th-century German women writers
Polish people murdered abroad
Polish revolutionaries
Assassinated Polish politicians
Assassinated German politicians
Assassinated Jews
Communist Party of Germany politicians
Communist women writers
Deaths by firearm in Germany
Emigrants from the Russian Empire to Germany
Executed Polish women
Executed activists
Executed communists
Executed German women
European democratic socialists
German anti-capitalists
German anti–World War I activists
German Ashkenazi Jews
German Marxist writers
German murder victims
German people of Polish-Jewish descent
German revolutionaries
German women philosophers
Independent Social Democratic Party politicians
Jewish German politicians
Jewish philosophers
Jewish socialists
Marxist theorists
People from Lublin Governorate
People from Zamość
People murdered in Berlin
People of the German Revolution of 1918–1919
Polish Ashkenazi Jews
Polish Marxists
Polish Marxist writers
20th-century German women politicians
Political party founders
Social Democracy of the Kingdom of Poland and Lithuania politicians
Social Democratic Party of Germany politicians
Women Marxists
Female revolutionaries
1910s murders in Berlin
1919 murders in Germany